William Terry may refer to:

Politicians
William Terry (MP for Kingston upon Hull), for Kingston upon Hull (UK Parliament constituency)
William Terry (MP for Arundel) for Arundel (UK Parliament constituency)
William Terry (Upper Canada politician) (1798–), political figure in Upper Canada
William Terry (congressman) (1824–1888), member of the United States Congress from Virginia and Confederate general
William L. Terry (1850-1917), U.S. Representative from Arkansas, father of David Dickson Terry

Others
Bill Terry (1898–1989) National League baseball player
William Richard Terry (1827-1897), Confederate general
William Terry (actor) (1914–1962), an American actor
William Terry, a pseudonym of British author Terry Harknett

See also
Bill Terry (disambiguation)